Jan Johansson is the name of:

 Jan Johansson (bluegrass musician) (born 1958), Swedish acoustic musician
 Jan Johansson (jazz musician) (1931–1968), Swedish jazz pianist
 Jan Johansson (bobsleigh) (born 1943), Olympic bobsledder
 Jan Emanuel Johansson (born 1974), Swedish healthcare entrepreneur and former Member of Parliament
 Jan Töve Johansson (born 1958), Swedish landscape photographer, publicist, writer
 Jan Johansson (bandy) (born 1935), Swedish bandy player

See also
 Jan Johansen (disambiguation)